"Out of Control" is the opening track and lead single of the eponymous debut album of American recording artist and actress Tuesday Knight. The song was released by Parc/CBS Records on August 20, 1987.

Background
"Out of Control" was written by Bob Marlette and album producer, Frank Wildhorn, who had yet to become well known for his Broadway musical Jekyll & Hyde, of which Knight appeared on the original demo. 

The song received decent exposure in dance clubs, and was promoted with a music video. The song was later featured on Knight's 2012 compilation album, Faith.

Track listings

References

External links
Tuesday Knight official site
Rapture Blondie Tribute Band

1987 singles
1987 songs
Songs written by Frank Wildhorn
Songs written by Bob Marlette
CBS Records singles